Ali Ezzeldin Abdelghany (born 16 June 1944 in Cairo) is an Egyptian academic and marine biologist.

Early life and education 
Abdelghany graduated with a bachelor of science degree from Cairo University in 1967. Abdelghany received a master's degree from Auburn University in 1982 with a specialization in Fisheries Management and his doctorate in Aquaculture nutrition from the University of Idaho in 1986.

Professional career 
Before earning his graduate degrees, Abdelghany received a fellowship with the Food and Agriculture Organization of the United Nations. After a formal education, Abdelghany returned to Egypt in 1986 and joined the Central Laboratory of Aquaculture Research at Sharqiyah as head of the department of nutrition. Since 1986, he has done research on various fish-related issues, including improving dietary growth and the reduction of feeding costs by using alternative methods. He has been appointed the director of CLAR twice (1993/1994 and 2001/2002).

See also
List of Auburn University people

Sources

1944 births
Living people
Cairo University alumni
Auburn University alumni
University of Idaho alumni
Egyptian biologists
Marine biologists
Fisheries scientists
Egyptian military personnel
Scientists from Cairo